HMS Pellew (F62) was one of a dozen Blackwood-class frigate (also known as the Type 14 class) of second-rate anti-submarine frigates built for the Royal Navy in the 1950s. She was named for Israel Pellew, who served during the French Revolutionary and Napoleonic Wars. He was brother to Edward Pellew, 1st Viscount Exmouth

Description
The ships were powered by one English Electric geared steam turbine that drove the single propeller shaft, using steam provided by two Babcock & Wilcox boilers. Their complement was 140 officers and ratings.

The ships were armed with three Bofors 40 mm guns in single mounts. The mount on the quarterdeck was later removed as it was unusable in heavy seas. They were equipped with two triple-barrelled Limbo Mark 10 anti-submarine mortars. The Blackwood-class ships had the same sonar suite as the larger s where the Limbo mortars were controlled by three sonars, the Type 174 search set, Type 162 target-classification set and the Type 170 'pencil beam' targeting set to determine the bearing and depth of the target.

Construction and career
The ship was named after Captain Sir Edward Pellew, later Viscount Exmouth. In 1965 Pellew was part of the 2nd Frigate Squadron based at Portland.  Her peacetime role was the training of officers and ratings in anti-submarine warfare. Between 1964 and 1965 the ship visited Calais, Kiel, Flushing, Cherbourg and Jersey.  She took part in Portsmouth 'Navy Days' in 1965.

She was adopted by the town of Teignmouth.

Broken up at Fleetwood, Lancashire, United Kingdom

Notes

Bibliography

 

 

Blackwood-class frigates
1954 ships
Ships built by Swan Hunter
Ships built on the River Tyne